The 2016–17 En Avant de Guingamp season is the 105th professional season of the club since its creation in 1912.

Current squad
As of 30 August 2016.

Out on loan

Transfers 

Transfers in:

Transfers out:

Loans in:

Statistics

Goalscorers
Includes all competitive matches

Last updated: 11 January 2017

Pre-season and friendlies

Competitions

Overall

Overview

Ligue 1

League table

Results summary

Results by round

Matches

Coupe de France

Coupe de la Ligue

References

Guingamp
En Avant Guingamp seasons